Keziz - abrupt; cut off, a city of the tribe of Benjamin. 

Hebrew Bible cities